The Howell–Butler House is a historic home located at Roseboro, Sampson County, North Carolina.   The house was built about 1900, and consists of a front two-story, three-bay-by-two-bay frame block, a wide rear ell and a two-room side wing.  It has a hipped roof, is sheathed in German siding, and features two massive, interior paneled brick chimneys and a wraparound porch. It has a center hall, double-pile interior.  Also on the property is the contributing frame storage house.

It was added to the National Register of Historic Places in 1986.

References

Houses on the National Register of Historic Places in North Carolina
Houses completed in 1900
Houses in Sampson County, North Carolina
National Register of Historic Places in Sampson County, North Carolina